The Sloy/Awe Hydro-Electric Scheme is a hydro-electric facility situated between Loch Sloy and Inveruglas on the west bank of Loch Lomond in Scotland.

The scheme was conceived by the Edinburgh architects Tarbolton & Ochterlony. Following Matthew Ochterlony's death in 1946, the scheme was progressed alone by Harold Tarbolton.

Construction began in May 1945, under the auspices of the North of Scotland Hydro-Electric Board and was completed in 1949. The official opening ceremony took place on 18 October 1950 and was attended by Queen Elizabeth. The project claimed a new British small tunnelling record January 1951, after a distance of 278 ft was bored over a period of seven days.

Historic Scotland has designated the modernist power-station building and the dam as listed buildings of categories A and B respectively.

Twenty-one men lost their lives during the construction. The labour force also included some German prisoners-of-war.

The facility is operated by Scottish and Southern Energy, and is normally in standby mode, ready to generate electricity to meet sudden peaks in demand. It can reach full capacity within 5 minutes from a standing start.

References

External links 

 Arrochar heritage website article

Hydroelectric power stations in Scotland
Buildings and structures in Argyll and Bute
Category A listed buildings in Argyll and Bute
Category B listed buildings in Argyll and Bute
1950 in Scotland